Everyday I Have the Blues is a studio album by American electric blues guitar pioneer T-Bone Walker. Originally released in 1969, it was his second solo album of the year and sandwiched between appearances on two blues compilation albums.

Critical reception

Stephen Thomas Erlewine, in a review for AllMusic, gave the album three out of five stars. He writes:

Track listing
Taken from album liner notes.

Personnel
 T-Bone Walker – guitar, vocals
 Louis Shelton – guitar
 Max Bennett – bass
 Paul Humphrey – drums
 Artie Butler – piano, organ
 Tom Scott – tenor saxophone
 Jack Hunt – engineer
 Gene Thompson – remix engineer
 Bob Thiele – producer
 Irv Glaser – cover photography
 Jim Marshall – photography
 Robert Flynn – design
 Carman Moore – liner notes

References

1969 albums
T-Bone Walker albums
Flying Dutchman Records albums